Kunkilling Forest Park is a forest park in the Gambia. Established on January 1, 1954, it covers 142 hectares.

The forest park is located in a village called Kerr Serrekunda on the southern bank of the River Gambia. The estimate terrain elevation above sea level is 6 metres.

References
  
 

Protected areas established in 1954
Forest parks of the Gambia